Ricardo Alexis Laborde León (born 16 February 1988) is a Colombian former footballer who played as a winger.

Club career
Laborde began his career as at Academia, where he played for a year, before moving to Náutico. In 2008, he moves to Europe to join the Swiss club FC Lugano. He played in 14 matches and scored his maiden goal against FC Schaffhausen. After a year Laborde moves back to Colombia for Atlético Huila.

Anorthosis Famagusta
In July 2010, Anorthosis Famagusta announced an agreement with Ricardo Laborde for a year loan. Laborde debuted on 24 August 2010 against CSKA Moscow in Arena Khimki for UEFA Europa League. He entered the game as a substitution in the 51st minute. In the rematch Laborde starts basic, at 19-minute he left the pitch due to injury On 1 December 2010, he scored a hat-trick against Akritas Chlorakas for an Anorthosis victory of 5–0. His first league goal for Anorthosis was scored in the derby against APOEL, securing the victory for his team with a 2–0 win. After 15 matches with Anorthosis Laborde had scored a total of 5 goals. He helped Anorthosis to place in the next UEFA Europa League Competition and to take 3rd place in the Local Division.

Before the 2011–12 season, the club extended his loan deal for a further two years. On 12 February 2012, Laborde won the Carlsberg award for Player of the Month for January. On 18 May, Laborde was named to the ANT1 Team of the Season. On 1 June, Laborde joined Anorthosis on a permanent deal, signing a five-year contract.

Krasnodar

On 18 May 2013, Krasnodar announced an agreement with Ricardo Laborde on a two-year contract, extending it till June 2017 in December 2014. On 1 May 2018, Laborde confirmed he would leave FC Krasnodar at the end of the 2017–18 season.

Return to Anorthosis
On 23 July 2018, he returned to Anorthosis Famagusta.

Career statistics

Club

Notes

Honours

Individual
 Carlsberg Player of the Month: January 2012
 ANT1 Team of the Season: 2011–12
PASP best goal of the week: 2011(16th Match day)

References

External links
 
 
 Football.ch

1988 births
Living people
Colombian footballers
Sportspeople from Cartagena, Colombia
Clube Náutico Capibaribe players
FC Lugano players
Anorthosis Famagusta F.C. players
Academia F.C. players
FC Krasnodar players
Atlético Huila footballers
Campeonato Brasileiro Série A players
Swiss Challenge League players
Cypriot First Division players
Russian Premier League players
Colombian expatriate footballers
Expatriate footballers in Brazil
Expatriate footballers in Switzerland
Expatriate footballers in Cyprus
Expatriate footballers in Russia
Association football midfielders